Zipporah Michelbacher Cohen (1853 – 1944) was an American civic leader including serving as the president of the Ladies Hebrew Benevolent Association in Richmond, Virginia.

Biography
Cohen née Michelbacher was born on December 13, 1853, in Richmond, Virginia.  She was the daughter of Miriam Angle Michelbacher and Congregation Beth Ahabah's Rabbi Maximilian Joseph Michelbacher. In 1875 she married Samuel Cohen, son of Levi Cohen, the founder of the Cohen Company, one of Richmond's largest department stores. The couple had three children.

In 1880 Cohen began her tenure as treasurer of the Richmond Eye, Ear, Nose and Throat Infirmary, a clinic for those unable to otherwise obtain medical care. In 1902 she joined the board of directors of the Instructive Visiting Nurses Association (IVNA) representing Richmond's Jewish community on the board. She served on the IVNA board for forty-two years. In 1904 Cohen was elected president of the Ladies Hebrew Benevolent Association (LHBA) (now Jewish Family Service). The LHBA provided assistance throughout Richmond.  She remained president until 1938, serving through the World War I era as well as the Great Depression.

Cohen died on August 20, 1944.

References

External links

 

1853 births
1944 deaths
People from Richmond, Virginia
19th-century American Jews
20th-century American Jews
Activists from Virginia